Dark Horse (2013) is a crime novel by Australian author Honey Brown. It won the Davitt Award for Best Adult Novel in 2014.

Plot summary

On Christmas Day Sarah Barnard escapes her disapproving parents by taking her trusted but damaged black mare Tansy into the Tasmanian mountains.  Trapped by a sudden storm she takes shelter but slowly comes to realise that she is not alone.

Notes

 Dedication: 
Where is the rich, dark earth, brown and moist?
Where is the smell of rain dripping from gum trees?
-John Marsden, The Rabbits

Reviews

The reader knows that not everything will be as it appears. The worry sets in early and doesn’t let up."

Fiona Hardy, for "Readings" bookshop, found herself unnerved by the book: "You’ll second-guess yourself throughout while reading this, and probably never go camping again."

Awards and nominations

 2014 winner Davitt Award – Best Adult Novel

References

2013 Australian novels
Australian crime novels
Penguin Books books